The 1982 British Formula Three Championship was the 32rd season of the British Formula Three Championship. The championship was clinched by Irish racing driver Tommy Byrne, driving for Murray Taylor Racing, with 101 points. The runner up was argentine driver, Enrique Mansilla, driving for West surrey racing, who finished only 2 points behind Byrne despite funding challenges caused by the Falklands War. The season also saw future Formula One stars Ayrton Senna and Martin Brundle win their first Formula Three races, Brundle at Oulton Park, and Senna at the non-championship race in november at Thruxton. The championship was 21 races starting with Silverstone on the 7th of March and ending with Thruxton on 24 October.

Race calendar and results

Championship Standings

References 

British Formula Three Championship seasons
1982 in British motorsport